Dimocarpus longan, commonly known as the longan and dragon's eye, is a tropical tree species that produces edible fruit. It is one of the better-known tropical members of the soapberry family Sapindaceae, to which the lychee and rambutan also belong. The fruit of the longan is similar to that of the lychee, but less aromatic in taste. It is native to tropical Asia and China.

The longan (from Cantonese lùhng-ngáahn , literally 'dragon eye'), is so named because it resembles an eyeball when its fruit is shelled (the black seed shows through the translucent flesh like a pupil and iris). The seed is small, round and hard, and of an enamel-like, lacquered black. The fully ripened, freshly harvested fruit has a bark-like shell, thin, and firm, making the fruit easy to peel by squeezing the pulp out as if one were  "cracking" a sunflower seed. When the shell has more moisture content and is more tender, the fruit becomes less convenient to shell. The tenderness of the shell varies due to either premature harvest, variety, weather conditions or storage conditions.

Subspecies 
Plants of the World Online lists:
 D. longan var. echinatus Leenhouts (Borneo, Philippines)
 D. longan var. longetiolatus Leenhouts (Viet Nam)
 D. longan subsp. malesianus Leenh. (widespread SE Asia)
 D. longan var. obtusus (Pierre) Leenh. (Indo-China)

Tree description

The branches are long and thick, typically drooping.

The leaves are pinnately compounded and alternate. There are 6 to 9 pairs of leaflets per leaf and the upper surface is wavy and a dark, glossy-green.

The longan tree produces light-yellow inflorescences at the end of branches. The small flowers have 5 to 6 sepals and petals that are brownish-yellow. The flower has a two-lobed pistil and 8 stamen. There are three flower types, distributed throughout the panicle; staminate (functionally male), pistillate (functionally female), and hermaphroditic flowers. Flowering occurs as a progression.

The peel is tan, thin, and leathery with tiny hairs. The flesh is translucent, and the seed is large and black with a circular white spot at the base. This gives the illusion of an eye. The flesh has a musky, sweet taste, which can be compared to the flavor of lychee fruit.

The longan tree is somewhat sensitive to frost. Longan trees prefer sandy soil. Longan trees prefer sandy soil with mild levels of acidity and organic matter. Longans usually bear fruit slightly later than lychees.

The wild longan population have been decimated considerably by large-scale logging in the past, and the species used to be listed as Vulnerable on the IUCN Red List. If left alone, longan tree stumps will resprout and the listing was upgraded to Near Threatened in 1998. Recent field data are inadequate for a contemporary IUCN assessment.

History 
The longan is believed to originate from the mountain range between Myanmar and southern China. Other reported origins include India, Sri Lanka, upper Myanmar, north Thailand, Kampuchea (more commonly known as Cambodia), north Vietnam and New Guinea.

Its earliest record of existence draws back to the Han dynasty in 200 BC. The emperor had demanded lychee and longan trees to be planted in his palace gardens in Shaanxi, but the plants failed. Four hundred years later, longan trees flourished in other parts of China like Fujian and Guangdong, where longan production soon became an industry.

Later on, due to immigration and the growing demand for nostalgic foods, the longan tree was officially introduced to Australia in the mid-1800s, Thailand in the late-1800s, and Hawaii and Florida in the 1900s. The warm, sandy-soiled conditions allowed for the easy growth of longan trees. This jump-started the longan industry in these locations.

Despite its long success in China, the longan is considered to be a relatively new fruit to the world. It has only been acknowledged outside of China in the last 250 years. The first European acknowledgment of the fruit was recorded by Joao de Loureiro, a Portuguese Jesuit botanist, in 1790. The first entry resides in his collection of works, Flora Cochinchinensis.

Currently, longan crops are grown in southern China, Taiwan, northern Thailand, Malaysia, Indonesia, Cambodia, Laos, Vietnam, India, Sri Lanka, Philippines, Australia, the United States, and Mauritius. It is also grown in Bangladesh.

Culinary uses
The fruit is sweet, juicy, and succulent in superior agricultural varieties. The seed and the peel are not consumed. Apart from being eaten raw like other fruits, longan fruit is also often used in Asian soups, snacks, desserts, and sweet-and-sour foods, either fresh or dried, and sometimes preserved and canned in syrup. The taste is different from lychees; while longan has a drier sweetness similar to dates, lychees are often messily juicy with a more tropical, grape-like sour sweetness.

Dried longan are often used in Chinese cuisine and Chinese sweet dessert soups. In Chinese food therapy and herbal medicine, it is believed to have an effect on relaxation. In contrast with the fresh fruit, which is juicy and white, the flesh of dried longans is dark brown to almost black.

Once fermented, it can be made into longan wine.

Nutrition

Raw longan fruit is 83% water, 15% carbohydrates, 1% protein, and contains negligible fat. In a 100 gram reference amount, raw longan supplies 60 calories of food energy, 101% of the Daily Value (DV) of vitamin C, 12% DV of riboflavin, and no other micronutrients in appreciable quantities.

Traditional medicine
Longan may be used in traditional Eastern folk medicine. Prior to the 1800s, longan was prevalent in Asia.

In ancient Vietnamese medicine, the "eye" of the longan seed was pressed against snakebites to absorb the venom. This was ineffective, but may still be used in the 21st century.

Growth, Harvest, and Distribution

Growth 
Longan, alongside its sister fruit litchi, thrive in humid areas or places with high rainfall, and can grow on most types of soil that does not induce issues with water drainage. Ample temperatures are also instrumental in longan growth - while longan can resist small stretches of cool temperatures, they can be damaged or killed in longer stretches of temperatures as high as -2 degrees Celsius. Younger plants tend to be more vulnerable to the cold than those more mature.

Harvest 
During harvest, pickers must climb ladders to carefully remove branches of fruit from longan trees. Longan fruit remain fresher if still attached to the branch, so efforts are made to prevent the fruit from detaching too early. Mechanical picking would damage the delicate skin of the fruit, so the preferred method is to harvest by hand. Knives and scissors are the most commonly used tools.

Fruit is picked early in the day to minimize water loss and to prevent high heat exposure, which would be damaging. The fruit is then placed into either plastic crates or bamboo baskets and taken to packaging houses, where the fruit undergo a series of checks for quality. The packaging houses are well-ventilated and shaded to prevent further decay. The process of checking and sorting are performed by workers instead of machinery. Any fruit that is split, under-ripe, or decaying is disposed of. The remaining healthy fruit is then prepped and shipped to markets.

Many companies add preservatives to canned longan. Regulations control the preserving process. The only known preservative added to canned longan is sulfur dioxide, to prevent discoloration. Fresh longan that is shipped worldwide is exposed to sulfur fumigation. Tests have shown that sulfur residues remain on the fruit skin, branches, and leaves for a few weeks. This violates many countries' limits on fumigation residue, and efforts have been made to reduce this amount.

Distribution 
Longan is found commonly in most of Asia, primarily in mainland China, Taiwan, Vietnam and Thailand. Like Vietnam, Thailand's economy relies heavily on the cultivation and shipments of longan as well as lychee. This increase in the production of longan reflects recent interest in exotic fruits in other parts of the world. However, the majority of the demand comes from Asian communities in North America, Europe and Australia.

Longan growth enhancement efforts 
While longan yields average out to 2 to 5 metric tons per hectare, there have been observed yields of up to 19.5 mt/ha in Israel. When investigating the difference, researchers found that the biggest areas of improvement for lychee yield came in improving crop management practices and the ambience surrounding the fields.

Efforts have been made to prolong longan's relatively short shelf life with chemical treatments based on SO2 in 2014.

Advancements in selective breeding have allowed scientists to find a strain of longan containing a "high proportion of aborted seeds" at the end of a thirty-year breeding program in 2001. Studies in 2015 that aimed to aid longan breeding efforts discovered that -20 degrees Celsius is the optimal temperature for long-term storage of longan pollen, a key ingredient in enabling longan breeding programs.

Diseases
Plant based diseases can affect both longan fruits and their trees, and the severity of these diseases can range from harmless cosmetic damage to rendering to the fruit inedible.

The most prevalent disease among longan plants is the Witch's broom, which can be found in all major longan-producing Asian territories, including China, Thailand, and Vietnam. Witch's Broom works on deforming longan skin, and at times having the plant prematurely drop their fruit, similar to the Phytophthora palmivora.

Another common disease that longan trees can carry is the aptly named Longan Decline, which is largely prevalent in Thailand, with reports finding that it could affect up to 40% of longan trees alone. Affected trees are more vulnerable to common tree pests and algae, and often bear low-quality fruit unworthy of yield.

Algal spot is another plant disease that can affect longan plants and trees. Common among tropical fruits, the disease mainly takes form as red-orange algae that can appear on a fruit-bearing tree's leaves or branches.Algal spot on longan plants, like many other tropical fruits, is caused by Cephaleuros virescens.

An oomycete disease that causes blight on leaves and foliage of a plant and affects the related lychee, Phytophthora palmivora, can also appear on both longan plants and fruit, particularly in the Thailand region. When affecting longan, it can create brown spots on the fruit in an erratic fashion, and can also cause longan to drop prematurely from the plant. Early symptoms can also include a dark necrosis on the plant itself.

Stem-end rot is a disease common amongst litchi and longan, and causes browning and rot on the stem of the fruit. Longan also suffer from various decay-accelerating fungi.

An oomycete disease that affects the related lychee - Phytophthora litchii - also afflicts D. longan.

Gallery

See also
Lansium parasiticum, the langsat  or lanzones

References

External links
 Longan Production in Asia from the Food and Agriculture Organization of the United Nations

Articles containing video clips
Cantonese cuisine
Chinese fruit
longan
Edible fruits
Flora of tropical Asia
Fruits originating in East Asia
Han dynasty
Indomalayan realm flora
Plants described in 1790
Traditional Chinese medicine
Trees of China
Tropical fruit